There were probably two Gunnar's bridge runestones at Kullerstad, which is about one kilometre northeast of Skärblacka, Östergötland County, Sweden, which is in the historic province of Östergötland, where a man named Håkon dedicated a bridge to the memory of his son Gunnar. The second stone was discovered in a church only 500 metres away and is raised in the cemetery. The second stone informs that Håkon raised more than one stone in memory of his son and that the son died vestr or "in the West."

Ög 162

The inscription on this stone, which is 1.6 metres in height, consists of a Christian cross above an arching runic text band and a second partial interior band. The design of the inscription is similar to that of Ög Fv1970;310, and it is believed that they originally formed a coupled monument and were carved by the same runemaster. The runic text on both stones indicates that Hákon constructed a bridge as a memorial to his son Gunnarr, who  died vestr or "in the West." Although the messages of most runestones are formulaic, some of them convey the sadness of those who raised them in memory of lost family members, like this runestone.

Transliteration of the runes into Latin characters
+ hakun + karþi + bru + þasi + ian + su skal + haita + kunas + bru + iai saʀ + uaʀ × sua + hakunaʀ +

Transcription into Old Norse
Hakon gærði bro þessi, en su skal hæita Gunnars bro, en saʀ vaʀ sunn Hakonaʀ.

Translation in English
Hákon made this bridge and it will be called Gunnarr's bridge. And he was Hákon's son.

Ög Fv1970;310

This runestone was found in the exterior wall of the church of Kullerstad in 1969 and is raised in the cemetery. It informs that Håkon raised more than one memorial for his son and that he died in the West. This runestone is discussed in further detail in the article Viking runestones under Ög Fv1970;310.

Transliteration of the runes into Latin characters
hakun + raiþi × kuml × þausi × eftiʀ × kunar + sun × sin × han × uarþ × taurþ × uastr +

Transcription into Old Norse
Hakon ræisþi kumbl þausi æftiʀ Gunnar, sun sinn. Hann varð dauðr vestr.

Translation in English
Hákon raised these monuments in memory of Gunnarr, his son. He died in the west.

Gallery

Notes

Sources
Larsson, Mats G. (2002). Götarnas Riken : Upptäcktsfärder Till Sveriges Enande. Bokförlaget Atlantis AB 

Kulturarv Östergötland, a site maintained by the County Museum of Östergötland.

External links
 An English Dictionary of Runic Inscriptions of the Younger Futhark, at the university of Nottingham

1969 archaeological discoveries
Runestones in memory of Viking warriors
Runestones in Östergötland